Kathryn "Kay" Waddell Takara (born 1943) is an American poet. She won a 2010 American Book Award for Pacific Raven: Hawai`i Poems.

Professional background
Takara graduated from Tufts University with a Bachelor's degree in 1965, from the University of California, Berkeley, with a Master's degree in 1969, and from University of Hawaiʻi with a PhD in 1995. She taught at the Interdisciplinary Studies Program at the University of Hawaiʻi at Mānoa.

Published works
New and Collected Poems, Ishmael Reed Publishing Company, 2003. 
Pacific Raven: Hawaii Poems, Pacific Raven Press, 2009. 
Tourmalines: Beyond the Ebony Portal, Pacific Raven Press, 2010.

References

External links
Author's website

1943 births
Living people
21st-century American women
Tufts University alumni
American women poets
American Book Award winners
University of Hawaiʻi at Mānoa alumni
University of Hawaiʻi at Mānoa faculty